Antonio Salvá Verd (born 24 April 1952), is a Spanish politician and urologist, member of the Congress of Deputies for Balearic Islands since 2019.

He was the father of Diego Salvá, a Civil Guard killed in a bomb attack by ETA in 2010 and brother and uncle of three victims in 1987 Zaragoza Barracks bombing.

He was candidate of right Vox in the November 2019 Spanish general election and won a seat. He ran unsuccessfully to a seat in the Senate por Mallorca in the April 2019 Spanish general election.

On 14 March 2020, during the ongoing coronavirus pandemic, announced that he was infected by SARS-CoV-2.

References 

1952 births
Living people
Members of the 14th Congress of Deputies (Spain)
Vox (political party) politicians
20th-century Spanish physicians
People from Mallorca
21st-century Spanish physicians
Urologists